TR-1A may refer to

 A "tactical recon" variant of the US Lockheed U-2 spy plane
 A variant of the Lyul'ka TR-1 1940's Soviet turbojet engine